Bêlit is a character from the world of Conan the Barbarian

Belit may also refer to:
 Bel (mythology) or Belit, a title for various gods in Babylonian religion

See also
 Belet-Seri, an underworld goddess in Babylonian religion
 Belit Ilani, a mistress of the gods in Babylonian religion